is a private women's college in Chiyoda, Tokyo, Japan, established in 1950. The predecessor of the school was founded in 1925.

Though the two share the same historical roots (and the website), this school and Tokyo Kasei-Gakuin University are distinct institutions.

Alumnae
Toyoko Tokiwa, photographer

References

External links
 Official website 

Educational institutions established in 1925
Private universities and colleges in Japan
Universities and colleges in Tokyo
Japanese junior colleges
1925 establishments in Japan